The 1979–80 Greek Football Cup was the 38th edition of the Greek Football Cup.

Tournament details

Totally 58 teams participated, 18 from Alpha Ethniki and 40 from Beta Ethniki. It was held in 6 rounds, including the final.

For the first time, a provincial club (not based in Attica and Thessaloniki Prefecture), Kastoria, was awarded the cup. They achieved an unexpected victory over Iraklis in the Final with the impressive score of 5–2, while at the same time ensured (for the first and only time until today) their participation in next season's Cup Winners' Cup.

In their way to the Final, Kastoria eliminated Ethnikos Piraeus (winning during extra time and while Ethnikos had 5 post hits), Kavala, Olympiakos Loutraki, AEL and Makedonikos.

On the other hand, Iraklis eliminated lower division teams Veria, Niki Volos, Almopos Aridea and Panarkadikos to reach the semifinals, where they faced rivals PAOK. Both matches were held in Iraklis home, Lysandros Kaftanzoglou Stadium and Iraklis progressed to the Final with a 2–1 aggregate victory. Before the second leg, there was an alleged bribe attempt of PAOK footballer, Filotas Pellios, by Iraklis. Due to those charges, Iraklis were eventually relegated to Beta Ethniki.

Earlier, PAOK had eliminated Olympiacos, AEK Athens and Aris, before they were eliminated by fellow-citizen Iraklis. Panathinaikos made an early exit from the cup, following the defeat by PAS Giannina in the Second Round.

From First Round matches, Panathinaikos, Olympiacos, PAOK and Iraklis won Beta Ethniki teams with big scores. Dimitris Tsironis of Kastoria was the top scorer with 9 goals, 3 of which scored in the Final. Kastoria success was decisive for some of their players' careers, as Sarganis, Simeoforidis, Papavasiliou and Dintsikos were later acquired by Olympiacos, Panathinaikos and AEK Athens, respectively.

Calendar

Knockout phase
Each tie in the knockout phase, apart from the first three rounds and the final, was played over two legs, with each team playing one leg at home. The team that scored more goals on aggregate over the two legs advanced to the next round. If the aggregate score was level, the away goals rule was applied, i.e. the team that scored more goals away from home over the two legs advanced. If away goals were also equal, then extra time was played. The away goals rule was again applied after extra time, i.e. if there were goals scored during extra time and the aggregate score was still level, the visiting team advanced by virtue of more away goals scored. If no goals were scored during extra time, the winners were decided by a penalty shoot-out. In the first three rounds and the final, which were played as a single match, if the score was level at the end of normal time, extra time was played, followed by a penalty shoot-out if the score was still level.The mechanism of the draws for each round is as follows:
There are no seedings, and teams from the same group can be drawn against each other.

First round

|}

Bracket

Second round

|}

Round of 16

|}

Quarter-finals

|}

Semi-finals

|}

* Both games held at Kaftanzoglio Stadium. The Second leg took part on 21 May.

Final

The 36th Greek Cup Final was played at the AEK Stadium.

References

External links
Greek Cup 1979-80 at RSSSF
sport24 Το έπος των γουναράδων at sport24.gr

Greek Football Cup seasons
Greek Cup
Cup